The 51st Iowa Volunteer Infantry Regiment was raised in Iowa in 1898 for service in the Philippines Theater of the Spanish–American War. The volunteers trained in Iowa and San Francisco at Camp Merritt near the Presidio, where a monument to the regiment still stands. While in California nearly 27 men died from disease, which made disease the leading cause of death amongst the men. From California they embarked on the SS Pennsylvania for Manila. After a lengthy and illness plagued voyage, the regiment arrived and were made to wait on board ship near Cavite.

Of the 1,344 who served, two died in combat, 41 died of disease and 38 were wounded. The regiment left for the United States on September 22, 1899, arrived 30 days later, and on November 2, was released after 18 months of duty.

External links
 http://www.spanamwar.com/51stiowa.htm
 http://www.iowahistory.org/museum/exhibits/medal-of-honor/birkhimer_edward_paw/51st%20Iowa.htm

Military units and formations of the United States in the Spanish–American War
Military units and formations established in 1898
Military units and formations disestablished in 1899